Thomas Cranston was an associate justice of the Rhode Island Supreme Court from August 1763 to May 1764, and served as Speaker of the Rhode Island House of Representatives at the time that Cranston, Rhode Island was created in 1754.  Historians believe either Cranston or his grandfather (or father) Samuel Cranston may be the namesake of Cranston, Rhode Island because the first page of the first town record book of Cranston bears the inscription "the gift of Thomas Cranston to the town called Cranston."

References

People of colonial Rhode Island
Members of the Rhode Island House of Representatives
Justices of the Rhode Island Supreme Court
1710 births
1785 deaths
18th-century American politicians